
Erpo Freiherr von Bodenhausen (12 April 1897 – 9 May 1945) was a German general who commanded the 12th Panzer Division during World War II. He was a recipient of the Knight's Cross of the Iron Cross of Nazi Germany. Bodenhausen committed suicide on 9 May 1945 in the Courland Pocket.

Awards
 Iron Cross (1914)  2nd Class (12 October 1915) & 1st Class (6 October 1917)
 Wound Badge (1914) in Black (27 September 1918)
 Clasp to the Iron Cross (1939) 2nd Class (22 September 1939) & 1st Class (30 September 1939)
 Panzer Badge in Bronze (1 November 1940)
 German Cross in Gold on 31 January 1942 as Oberstleutnant in Schützen-Regiment 28
 Knight's Cross of the Iron Cross on 17 December 1943 as Generalmajor and commander of 12. Panzer-Division

References

Citations

Bibliography

 
 
 

1897 births
1945 deaths
People from Werra-Meißner-Kreis
People from Hesse-Nassau
Lieutenant generals of the German Army (Wehrmacht)
German Army personnel of World War I
Barons of Germany
Recipients of the clasp to the Iron Cross, 1st class
Recipients of the Gold German Cross
Recipients of the Knight's Cross of the Iron Cross
German military personnel who committed suicide
Prussian Army personnel
Reichswehr personnel
Suicides in the Soviet Union
Military personnel from Hesse